

First round draft picks

The following are the first round picks in the 1985 Major League Baseball draft.

Supplemental First Round Selections

Background
Six of the first eight draft picks from the June regular phase had at least one full year of major league experience prior to the start of the 1987 season. Included in that list were B.J. Surhoff (Milwaukee), the draft's number one pick, Will Clark (San Francisco), Bobby Witt (Texas), Barry Larkin (Cincinnati), Pete Incaviglia (Montreal) and Barry Bonds (Pittsburgh).

Incaviglia was selected eighth overall by the Expos, but was unable to reach a contract and was traded to Texas. He made his major league debut on Opening Day 1986 as the Rangers' left fielder, becoming just the 15th drafted player to go directly to the majors.

, this year's draft class has accumulated the highest Baseball-Reference Wins Above Replacement total of any class in the draft's history.

Other notable players
Bruce Ruffin, 2nd round, 34th overall by the Philadelphia Phillies
Mike Schooler, 2nd round, 35th overall by the Seattle Mariners
Randy Johnson‡, 2nd round, 36th overall by the Montreal Expos
Scott Servais, 2nd round, 48th overall by the New York Mets, but did not sign
Wally Whitehurst, 3rd round, 65th overall by the Oakland Athletics
Paul Abbott, 3rd round, 67th overall by the Minnesota Twins
Tino Martinez†, 3rd round, 75th overall by the Boston Red Sox, but did not sign
Bobby Thigpen†, 4th round, 85th overall by the Chicago White Sox
David Justice†, 4th round, 94th overall by the Atlanta Braves
Mike Macfarlane, 4th round, 97th overall by the Kansas City Royals
Chad Kreuter, 5th round, 109th overall by the Texas Rangers
Mike Devereaux, 5th round, 116th overall by the Los Angeles Dodgers
Jeff Brantley†, 6th round, 134th overall by the San Francisco Giants
Deion Sanders, 6th round, 149th overall by the Kansas City Royals, but did not sign
Todd Pratt, 6th round, 153rd overall by the Boston Red Sox
Doug Henry, 8th round, 185th overall by the Milwaukee Brewers
Mark Gardner, 8th round, 192nd overall by the Montreal Expos
Al Martin, 8th round, 198th overall by the Atlanta Braves
Kevin Tapani, 9th round, 234th overall by the Chicago Cubs, but did not sign
Jason Grimsley, 10th round, 252nd overall by the Philadelphia Phillies
Brady Anderson†, 10th round, 257th overall by the Boston Red Sox
Greg Harris, 10th round, 258th overall by the San Diego Padres
Don Wakamatsu, 11th round, 266th overall by the Cincinnati Reds
Jeff Manto, 14th round, 355th overall by the California Angels
Mike Stanley†, 16th round, 395th overall by the Texas Rangers
Dennis Cook, 18th round, 446th overall by the San Francisco Giants
Randy Velarde, 19th round, 475th overall by the Chicago White Sox
Brian Jordan†, 20th round, 505th overall by the Cleveland Indians, but did not sign
Bo Jackson†, 20th round, 511th overall by the California Angels, but did not sign
John Smoltz‡, 22nd round, 574th overall by the Detroit Tigers
Mark Grace†, 24th round, 622nd overall by the Chicago Cubs
Ed Sprague Jr.†, 26th round, 673rd overall by the Boston Red Sox, but did not sign
Jim Abbott, 36th round, 826th overall by the Toronto Blue Jays, but did not sign

† All-Star  
‡ Hall of Famer

NFL/NBA players drafted
Mike Prior, 4th round, 90th overall by the Los Angeles Dodgers, but did not sign
Dell Curry, 14th round, 359th overall by the Baltimore Orioles, but did not sign

External links
Complete draft list from The Baseball Cube database
Best draft ever?

References

Major League Baseball draft
Draft
Major League Baseball draft